Johan Creten (born 1963) is a Flemish sculptor, born in Sint-Truiden, Belgium. He lives and works in Paris, France. In 2009 he was nominated for the Flemish Culture Prize.

Life and career

Exhibitions 

2003
 "Johan Creten", Bass Museum of Art, Miami, USA

2007
 "Johan Creten. Beelden", Stedelijk Museum de Lakenhal, Leiden, Netherlands

2008
 "Johan Creten- De gewonden/Les Blessées", Keramiekmuseum Princessehof, Leeuwarden, Netherlands
 "Johan Creten, sculptures", Musée de la Chasse et de la Nature, Paris, France

References

Belgian sculptors
Living people
1963 births
Belgian contemporary artists